Kenneth Neil Cukier (born 1968) is an American journalist and author of books on technology and society. He is best known for his work at The Economist and the book Big Data: A Revolution that Will Transform How We Work, Live and Think, coauthored with Viktor Mayer-Schönberger and published by Houghton Mifflin Harcourt in 2013.

Career
He has also written for The New York Times, Financial Times, Foreign Affairs and other publications. He was technology editor of the Wall Street Journal Asia edition in Hong Kong in 2001. In 1999 he coined the term "Frenchelon" to describe the French government's surveillance capabilities.

Publications

Big Data was a New York Times bestseller, translated into 21 languages and a finalist for the Financial Times and McKinsey Business Book of the Year Award. The pair published a follow-on work in 2014, Learning With Big Data: The Future of Education. In 2021 Cukier published Framers: Human Advantage in an Age of Technology and Turmoil on the power of mental models and the limits of artificial intelligence with Mayer-Schönberger and a third coauthor, Francis de Véricourt.

Media

In a radio interview in September 2016, Cukier described the current big data revolution as an agent of change similar to the  Gutenberg press and the Printing Revolution. He cautioned that while there will be huge benefits, there is a need to have limitations in place to "preserve our fundamental freedoms" and to prevent Big Data from being another version of Orwell's Big Brother.

Boards
In 2008 he was named to the board of directors of International Bridges to Justice. In 2015 he joined the board of The Open String Foundation, which provides classical instruments to disadvantaged children.

Affiliations
In 2016 he was elected as a trustee of Chatham House, a British international affairs institute. In 2017 he was named an associate fellow at the University of Oxford's Said Business School, where he has run sessions on artificial intelligence and business.

Awards
He received an honorary doctorate of humane letters from Wittenberg University in Springfield, Ohio.

References

External links
 Kenneth Neil Cukier A current list of press appearances and articles in the Economist
 

Living people
1968 births
American male journalists
The Economist people